Ill at Ease may refer to:

 Ill at Ease (The Methadones album), 2001
 Ill at Ease (The Mark of Cain album), 1995